Bedminster Township is a township in Bucks County, Pennsylvania. The population was 6,574 at the 2010 census. It is part of the Delaware Valley metropolitan region. Bedminster is part of Pennridge School District.

History
Deep Run Presbyterian Church was established before 1725, Reverend William Tennant served as pastor from 1726 to 1738. In 1741, thirty-five residents, mostly Irish and German, petitioned the Court of Quarter Sessions to lay out the township which was granted and the land was surveyed by John Chapman. The name was taken from the town of the same name in Somersetshire, near Bristol, England. In 1841, the original church building was replaced, the new building was commonly called the 'Irish Meeting House', which still stands today. By 1746, enough Mennonites moved into the township to build a log church in the southeastern part of the township. The Tohickon Reformed Church was organized probably in June, 1745, the first pastor was Reverend John Conrad Wirtz, of Zurich, Switzerland. Keller's Church was founded by Lutherans in 1744.

The Stover-Myers Mill was listed on the National Register of Historic Places in 1978.

Geography
It is drained by the Tohickon Creek, which forms its northern boundary and drains eastward into the Delaware River. Lake Nockamixon forms much of the NW boundary.

Place names
Its villages include Bedminster, Bedminster Center, Deep Run, Elephant, Fretz, Griers Corner (also in Hilltown and Plumstead Townships), Hagersville, Jacobsville, Keelersville, Kellers Church, Kulps Corner (also in Hilltown Township), Owlsburg, Pipersville, and Weisel.

Natural features
Water features include Cabin Run, Deep Run, Deer Run, Haycock Creek, Mink Run, Northeast Branch of the Perkiomen Creek, Tohickon Creek, and Wolf Run.

Neighboring municipalities
 Tinicum Township (northeast)
 Plumstead Township (southeast)
 Hilltown Township (southwest)
 Dublin (southwest)
 East Rockhill Township (west)
 Haycock Township (northwest)
 Nockamixon Township (north)

Demographics

As of the 2010 census, the township was 93.6% White, 0.8% Black or African American, 0.2% Native American, 1.9% Asian, and 1.7% were two or more races. 2.5% of the population were of Hispanic or Latino ancestry.

As of the census of 2000, there were 4,804 people, 1,788 households, and 1,333 families residing in the township.  The population density was 159.3 people per square mile (61.5/km).  There were 1,868 housing units at an average density of 61.9/sq mi (23.9/km).  The racial makeup of the township was 98.13% White, 0.58% African American, 0.02% Native American, 0.42% Asian, 0.02% Pacific Islander, 0.19% from other races, and 0.65% from two or more races. Hispanic or Latino of any race were 0.92% of the population.

There were 1,788 households, out of which 32.0% had children under the age of 18 living with them, 65.6% were married couples living together, 6.1% had a female householder with no husband present, and 25.4% were non-families. 19.5% of all households were made up of individuals, and 7.0% had someone living alone who was 65 years of age or older.  The average household size was 2.68 and the average family size was 3.13.

In the township the population was spread out, with 24.5% under the age of 18, 6.5% from 18 to 24, 29.3% from 25 to 44, 26.9% from 45 to 64, and 12.8% who were 65 years of age or older.  The median age was 40 years. For every 100 females, there were 103.3 males.  For every 100 females age 18 and over, there were 98.9 males.

The median income for a household in the township was $56,281, and the median income for a family was $64,338. Males had a median income of $42,015 versus $28,024 for females. The per capita income for the township was $29,153.  About 2.8% of families and 3.9% of the population were below the poverty line, including 4.2% of those under age 18 and 8.0% of those age 65 or over.

Climate

According to the Köppen climate classification system, Bedminster Township has a Hot-summer, Humid continental climate (Dfa). Dfa climates are characterized by at least one month having an average mean temperature ≤ , at least four months with an average mean temperature ≥ , at least one month with an average mean temperature ≥  and no significant precipitation difference between seasons. Although most summer days are slightly humid in Bedminster Township, episodes of heat and high humidity can occur with heat index values > . The average wettest month is July which corresponds with the annual peak in thunderstorm activity. Episodes of extreme cold and wind can occur with wind chill values < . Ice storms and large snowstorms depositing ≥  of snow occur once every few years, particularly during nor’easters from December through February.

Ecology

According to the A. W. Kuchler U.S. potential natural vegetation types, Bedminster Twp would have a dominant vegetation type of Appalachian Oak (104) with a dominant vegetation form of Eastern Hardwood Forest (25). The spring bloom typically begins by April 13 and fall color usually peaks by October 27.

Transportation

The main highways serving Bedminster Township include Pennsylvania Route 113, Pennsylvania Route 313, Pennsylvania Route 413 and Pennsylvania Route 611. PA 113 follows a southwest-to-northeast alignment along Bedminster Road through the heart of the township, while PA 313 follows Dublin Pike along the township's southwestern border. PA 413 briefly enters the eastern edge of the township before terminating at PA 611, which follows a north-south alignment through eastern portions of Bedminster.

Notable person
Johann Adam Eyer, fraktur artist

References

External links

Townships in Bucks County, Pennsylvania
Townships in Pennsylvania